The Faithful Bride of Granada is a 1704 tragedy by the English writer William Taverner. It was the only tragedy by Tarverner, better known for his comedies.

The original cast included John Mills as Abdolin, Robert Wilks as Abinomin, Philip Griffin as Osmin, Benjamin Husband as Albovade, Jane Rogers as Zelinda, Frances Maria Knight as Abenede and Mary Kent as Zaida.

References

Bibliography
 Burling, William J. A Checklist of New Plays and Entertainments on the London Stage, 1700-1737. Fairleigh Dickinson Univ Press, 1992.
 Nicoll, Allardyce. History of English Drama, 1660-1900, Volume 2. Cambridge University Press, 2009.

1704 plays
English plays
West End plays
Tragedy plays
Plays by William Taverner